William Jason Maxwell Borthwick (1 November 1910 – 15 January 1998) was the son of Hon. William Borthwick and Ruth Margery Rigby. He married Elizabeth Cleveland Elworthy, daughter of Herbert Elworthy, on 26 July 1937. He died at the age of 87.

William Jason Maxwell Borthwick usually went by his middle name of Jason. He was educated at Winchester College and at Trinity College, Cambridge. He was admitted to the Inner Temple in 1933 and was entitled to practice as a barrister. During the Second World War, he gained the rank of commander in the service of the Royal Naval Volunteer Reserve. He was decorated with the Distinguished Service Cross (DSC).

Career highlights
Commander Jason Borthwick was a director of naval fighter aircraft, whose captain did not speak to him for a year until he won a DSC. He pioneered Naval Fighter Direction, the science of interpreting radar screens so as to send fighters out on the right bearing, at the correct height, and with enough time to intercept incoming enemy aircraft. He served in  during Operation Pedestal, and on Admiral Ramsay's staff for the D-Day landings in Normandy in June 1944. He was Chief Instructor of the Fighter Direction School, and organised fighter direction in Indian Ocean operations, including the invasion of Rangoon in May 1945.

Development of fighter direction

Fighter direction was developed during the Second World War: the concept of the control and direction of Naval fighter aircraft from their parent Aircraft carrier had not been conceived prior to 1935. In the second half of 1942, working in the Home Fleet in the Navy's only operational radar-fitted Fleet carrier, Jason Borthwick in HMS Victorious was mastering the art of intercepting long-range Focke-Wulf Fw 200 aircraft. These attacked convoys far out in the Atlantic, in conditions of cloud and visibility very different from those prevailing in the Mediterranean. He operated in a corner of the plotting office with a homemade plotting board, portable R/T set and an array of voice pipes. He was assisted by one untrained plotter. At first he had an uphill task establishing his position in a big ship's hierarchy, but continuing success brought status. A year later he had his own Fighter Direction Office, a Fighter Direction Officer as Filter Officer with two plotters, two Intercept Officers with and intercept plot each, and a third intercept for Borthwick to use in emergency. He sat at a dais with room for the Fleet Direction Officer beside him.

HMS Victorious was then chosen as flagship for Operation Pedestal in August 1942, being a no-holds-barred attempt to relieve the island of Malta. Apart from her experience against FW 200 long-range reconnaissance aircraft in the Atlantic, she had previously covered Malta convoys as part of Force H, based at Gibraltar. At that time, HMS Victorious had the best Fighter Direction Office in the Fleet. The operation led to the most intense sea-air battle against the Luftwaffe yet seen, and the first full-scale test of the recent improvements in the Royal Navy's fighter direction.

C-in-C Home Fleet regarded the Victorious Fighter Direction Office as a showpiece for VIP visitors. On one occasion the Prime Minister climbed into Borthwick's high chair at the dais, which had been unscrewed from the desk for maintenance. The chair tilted forward, and only a quick grab of each arm by C-in-C and the Fighter Direction Officer saved Churchill from a dive. These VIP visits helped Borthwick to obtain hardware and, above all, good officers.

References

1910 births
1998 deaths
Royal Navy officers
Members of the Inner Temple
Royal Naval Volunteer Reserve personnel of World War II
Recipients of the Distinguished Service Cross (United Kingdom)
People educated at Winchester College
Alumni of Trinity College, Cambridge
Elworthy family